Roosevelt House may refer to:

 Roosevelt House, a former high-rise apartment building for senior citizens, in Atlanta, Georgia; see Demolished public housing projects in Atlanta#Roosevelt House
 Roosevelt House Public Policy Institute at Hunter College
 Isaac Roosevelt House, Hyde Park, New York, listed on the U.S. National Register of Historic Places
 Sara Delano Roosevelt Memorial House, New York, New York, NRHP-listed
 Home of Franklin D. Roosevelt National Historic Site
Theodore Roosevelt Birthplace National Historic Site, Manhattan, New York
Theodore Roosevelt Inaugural National Historic Site, Buffalo, New York
Sagamore Hill, Oyster Bay, New York